Víctor Leonel Altobelli (born 20 July 1986 in Roque Sáenz Peña, Chaco) is an Argentine footballer.

Career

Altobelli made his debut on December 3, 2004 for Tigre. In August 2009, he was loaned to Albacete Balompié. However, after one season he returned to Tigre. In the second half of 2011, he was transferred to Independiente Rivadavia.

References

External links
 Argentine Primera statistics
 Tigre profile

1986 births
Living people
People from Presidencia Roque Sáenz Peña
Argentine expatriate footballers
Argentine footballers
Argentine Primera División players
Club Atlético Tigre footballers
Albacete Balompié players
Independiente Rivadavia footballers
Club de Gimnasia y Esgrima La Plata footballers
Club Almirante Brown footballers
Cobreloa footballers
Leonel Altobelli
Barracas Central players
Othellos Athienou F.C. players
Primera B de Chile players
Cypriot Second Division players
Expatriate footballers in Chile
Argentine expatriate sportspeople in Chile
Expatriate footballers in Spain
Argentine expatriate sportspeople in Spain
Argentine expatriate sportspeople in Cyprus
Expatriate footballers in Cyprus
Expatriate footballers in Thailand
Argentine expatriate sportspeople in Thailand
Association football forwards
Sportspeople from Chaco Province